Sheelagh Mary Murnaghan,    (26 May 1924 – 14 September 1993) was an Ulster Liberal Party Member of Parliament (MP) in the House of Commons of Northern Ireland at Stormont.

Early life 

Sheelagh Mary Murnaghan was born on 24 May 1924 to Josephine Mary Morrogh and Vincent Hugh Murnaghan. She was the eldest of their six children. Her grandfather, George Murnaghan was a well-known nationalist politician in Ireland. She was educated at Loreto Grammar School in Omagh, Loreto Abbey in Rathfarnham and studied law in Queen's University Belfast, graduating in 1947. While studying in Queen's University, Murnaghan also captained the hockey team from 1955 to 1956 and was the first female president of the Literary and Scientific Debating Society; also known as The Literific.

Political career 
After graduating from college, Murnaghan became "[one] of only nine women ever elected to the fifty-two-seat Stormont House of Commons during its fifty-year existence". She became a member of the Ulster Liberal Association in 1959 and finished her political career in November 1968 when the seat for Queen's University Belfast was abolished. "Sheelagh was seen as a slightly eccentric figure", according to Ruth Illingworth, during her time as a politician.

While an MP, Murnaghan campaigned to abolish the death penalty and for a bill of human rights. When her seat was abolished, she failed to win North Down at the 1969 Northern Ireland general election, and was also unsuccessful in Belfast South at the 1973 Northern Ireland Assembly election. During the 1970s, she sat on various quangos, including the Industrial Relations Tribunal and the Equal Opportunities Commission. She continued to practice at the Bar, specialising in harassment cases.

She died in 1993, aged 69, from undisclosed causes.

References

External links
Biographies of Members of the Northern Ireland House of Commons
https://liberalhistory.org.uk/wp-content/uploads/2014/10/71_Rynder_Sheelagh_Murnaghan.pdf

1924 births
1993 deaths
Alumni of Queen's University Belfast
Women members of the House of Commons of Northern Ireland
Members of the Bar of Northern Ireland
Members of the House of Commons of Northern Ireland 1958–1962
Members of the House of Commons of Northern Ireland 1962–1965
Members of the House of Commons of Northern Ireland 1965–1969
Barristers from Northern Ireland
Officers of the Order of the British Empire
Politicians from Belfast
Politicians from Dublin (city)
People from Omagh
Place of death missing
Ulster Liberal Party members of the House of Commons of Northern Ireland
Women lawyers from Northern Ireland
Female field hockey players from Northern Ireland
Irish female field hockey players
British female field hockey players
Members of the House of Commons of Northern Ireland for Queen's University of Belfast
Ireland international women's field hockey players
Liberal Party (UK) parliamentary candidates
20th-century women lawyers